Kenneth Carlon (5 October 1923 – 5 January 2004) was an Australian rules footballer who played with Melbourne in the Victorian Football League (VFL).

War Service
Carlon served in the Australian Army during World War II.

Football
After first training with Melbourne in 1946, Carlon made his senior debut in 1949 and played 30 games over two seasons. He was subsequently was captain of Melbourne's Reserve side in 1951 and 1952.

In 1953, Carlon was captain / coach of the Rennie Football Club in the Coreen & District Football League.

In 1954, Carlon was appointed as coach of the Cornwall Football Club in Launceston, Tasmania.

Notes

External links 

1923 births
Australian rules footballers from Victoria (Australia)
Melbourne Football Club players
Greensborough Football Club players
2004 deaths